Günther Blumentritt (10 February 1892 – 12 October 1967) was an officer in World War I, who became a Staff Officer under the Weimar Republic and went on to serve as a general for Nazi Germany during World War II. He served throughout the war, mostly on the Western Front, and mostly as a Staff Officer, though he was eventually given his own Corps and made a General der Infanterie. Blumentritt was instrumental in planning the 1939 German invasion of Poland and the 1940 invasion of France, he participated in Operation Barbarossa, and afterward bore a large part of the responsibility for planning the defense of the Atlantic Wall and Normandy. After the war, Blumentritt gave an affidavit at the Nuremberg Trials, though he never testified in person, and then later helped in the rearmament of Germany during the Cold War and the development of the modern German army.

Personal life and early career

Family and character
Born in Munich, Günther Alois Friedrich Blumentritt was the son of Günther Blumentritt (born 23 June 1859), town planner and a Privy Councilor in Munich and Lina Rückart (born 24 March 1868). In 1920 he married Mathilde Schollmeyer, and subsequently had two children with her; they remained married 47 years, until her death in 1967. Blumentritt was described as the opposite in many ways of his long-time commander Gerd von Rundstedt: Bavarian and Catholic, where von Rundstedt was Prussian and Protestant, swarthy and short whereas Rundstedt was tall and pale. Blumentritt was affable, friendly, and talkative, capable of great diplomacy, and in military terms, detail oriented—all of which made him an excellent staff officer, as well as a good complement to Rundstedt.

Early military career
He joined the Imperial German Army in 1911, in time to see action in the First World War, entering the 3rd Thuringian Infantry Regiment No. 71. as a Fahnenjunker. In 1912, he attended the Danzig Kriegsakademie (War Academy), and shortly afterward was promoted to leutnant (lieutenant). During the war, he served mostly on the Eastern Front in Prussia, after a brief contact with the French and Belgians at Namur in August, 1914. In August 1918, he was wounded in action and received the Wound Badge in black. By the end of the war he was an oberleutnant. He was conferred the command of his first regiment on 20 February 1919.

Blumentritt's experiences on the Eastern Front in the First World War gave him a great deal of respect for the Russian soldiers. He maintained this respect throughout his career, and regretted that many of his fellow officers, with less experience in the East, did not share it. He said of the Russians, "... in defense the Imperial Russian Army was stubborn and tenacious and they were masters at constructing defensive positions with great speed. The Russian soldier showed great skill in night operations and in forest fighting, and he preferred hand-to-hand combat. His physical needs were slight and his ability to stand up to punishment unshaken truly astounding."

Later, during the interwar period Blumentritt served as a company leader in the 3rd Thuringian Infantry Regiment No. 71 from 20 February 1919. After the military restrictions imposed by the Treaty of Versailles came into effect, he was briefly a member of the Freikorps (paramilitary organization) formed by the veterans of the 3rd Thuringian, before transferring back to the regular army with the 22nd Reichswehr Rifle Regiment on 1 October 1919. Then later he served as a staff officer in several positions, first as operations command officer from 1 April 1926 in the staff of the 6th Division. He was promoted to major in September, 1933, then worked as a lecturer and tactics instructor at the Kriegsakademie in 1935, and finally was promoted to oberst in October 1938. He eventually served as a staff officer under Wilhelm Ritter von Leeb, along with his friend Erich von Manstein.

Second World War

German invasions
On 7 May 1939, Blumentritt submitted to his superiors a working plan for the German Invasion of Poland. At this time, he was assigned to the Oberkommando des Heeres (Army High Command; OKH), and formed along with Manstein and Generalfeldmarshall Gerd von Rundstedt a "Working Staff" for the development of a plan for the invasion. The plan he submitted was called Fall Weiss (Case White) and was subsequently put into action with little alteration. Then on 2 September 1939, Blumentritt was transferred to the general staff of Army Group South (one of the two German Army Groups to carry out the invasion) in Silesia under Rundstedt. This collaboration began his long and intimate friendship with Rundstedt, which was to last for many years. Blumentritt was Rundstedt's Chief of Operations, while Manstein was Chief of Staff. The invasion was put into motion, after some delays, on 1 September 1939, and by 6 October the entire country of Poland was subdued.

In 1940, Blumentritt—as the Operations Officer of Army Group A (again under von Rundstedt)—took part in the planning (with von Manstein and Henning von Tresckow) and execution of the invasion of France. The plan he helped develop was called Sichelschnitt or "Sickle Cut", and was later referred to as the Manstein Plan. The subsequent unmitigated success of the German Blitzkrieg in France and the complete collapse of the French defense shocked even the Germans. However, as the German army closed in on complete victory, Blumentritt and Rundstedt ignored conflicting orders from the OKH to advance on the British and French position at Dunkirk, and instead followed Adolf Hitler′s order to halt for three days, consequently allowing the evacuation of the British Forces.

Immediately after the German occupation of France, Rundstedt, Blumentritt, and others were tasked with preparing for the invasion of Great Britain. This plan, as handed down from high command, was designated Operation Sea Lion. Blumentritt helped with the details of the plan, and several exercises were carried out in preparation for it, but he never believed that it was a serious option, or that Hitler intended to carry it out. He said that at the end of July or August "...Field-Marshal von Rundstedt was in Berlin, and Hitler stated quite clearly to him that he did not intend to carry out Sea Lion," and further, "By the end of September it was clear that the invasion of England was off."

In 1941, Blumentritt, under General Günther von Kluge, was made Chief of Staff of the 4th Army and promoted to general. Despite his initial opposition he later was involved in the planning and operation of the German invasion of the Soviet Union. On 18 April 1941, Blumentritt wrote:

Maybe the Russians really intend to stand and fight the Germans between the western border and the Dnieper, a move which would be desirable...Even the Imperial Army was no match for the German command, and the Russian commanders today are at an even greater disadvantage. The shortcomings of the middle ranks are even greater...The effects of German weapons, whose prestige has increased with the campaign against Yugoslavia, will soon be felt! There will be fourteen days of heavy fighting. Hopefully, by then we shall have made it.

In another memo, Blumentritt wrote:

On warfare and the inner value of the Russian opponent, the dull mass had two kinds of "ideas": the tsar and God. Today, there is neither. Bolshevism has taken their place. I consider that to be a weakness since I never believed that this idea means anything to the bulk of the Russian people. That is why I do not believe that the people will be carried away by Bolshevism. They will soon be indifferent and fatalistic.

Blumentritt's command was part of Army Group Center, which suffered massive casualties and the 4th Army itself only narrowly escaped envelopment and annihilation by the Russians outside Moscow. After the ultimate failure of Operation Barbarossa in January 1942, Blumentritt returned to Germany as Chief Quartermaster of the OKH. Late in the year he personally recommended to his superiors that the Germans should withdraw from Stalingrad, receiving the support of Chief of Staff OKH—General Franz Halder—in this recommendation, but the idea of any withdrawal was rejected by Hitler.

Normandy and the July Plot

In September 1942, Blumentritt was made Chief of Staff to Rundstedt, overall commander of German forces in the west (OB West). In this capacity, he was responsible for much of the planning to defend France against Allied invasion, and in 1943 he sent a memo to the OKH expressing his concern about the depletion of German forces along the Atlantic Wall as the Eastern Front continued to bleed resources from the West. During the invasion of Normandy in 1944, he and his commander were taken by surprise at the location of the landings on the Cherbourg peninsula, later saying, "The disposition would more truly be described as ′coast protection′ rather than ′defense′! As we did not anticipate that any landing would be made on the west side of the Cherbourg peninsula, that sector was held very lightly—we even put Russian units there."

Rundstedt was relieved of his command by Hitler on 2 July 1944, after suggesting that Germany should surrender, and was replaced as OB West by Kluge. Blumentritt served as Chief of Staff under Kluge during the Anglo-Canadian offensive on Caen and the fighting in the Falaise Pocket. However, in July 1944, Blumentritt was implicated, along with Kluge, in the July 1944 conspiracy to kill Hitler; the plot failed, resulting in the arrest of many Army officers. Blumentritt himself was removed from his position (and Kluge committed suicide on 17 August), but he survived the purge because Hitler did not believe him guilty, and in fact later awarded him the Knight's Cross of the Iron Cross (Ritterkreuz des Eisernen Kreuzes) for his services.

Additionally, Blumentritt acted as a kind of ambassador between the SS and the Army in France after the coup attempt. Over 1,000 SS officers—including the head of the SS in France, Carl Oberg, and the head of the SS Security Service in Paris, Helmut Knochen—had been arrested by the German military commander in France, Carl-Heinrich von Stülpnagel, who was complicit in the plot. This presented a problem for the Army when it was revealed that Hitler was still alive and in charge. After a meeting in Paris, Blumentritt was able to work out a deal with Oberg and Knochen whereby relations were patched up between the Army and the SS, and the involvement of many of the conspirators in Paris was never discovered.

Combat command and German surrender
Shortly after the upheaval associated with the assassination attempt, Blumentritt returned to his position as Chief of Staff of OB West, first under Generalfeldmarshall Walter Model, then once again under Rundstedt when he was restored to command. However, he now served as a field commander rather than a staff officer, as he had been removed from his post as Chief of Staff and given a combat command and after being shuffled around to the LXXXVI Armeekorps and the LVII Panzerkorps, he was tapped as leader of "Corps Group Blumentritt" consisting of the XII SS Armeekorps (made up of the 176. Infantrie under Oberst Landau and the 183. Volksgrenadier under General Lange).

Under Model and then the restored Rundstedt, the German army fell back, defending the Siegfried Line. Blumentritt and his command bore responsibility for almost  of front northwest of Loverich (now part of Baesweiler) through Geilenkirchen all the way to the Meuse. After the Allied victory just to the south in the Battle of the Bulge, they turned their attention north to Blumentritt's position. Subsequently, he and the XII SS Korps failed in their attempt to hold the salient of the Roer Triangle during the British Operation Blackcock.

On 29 January 1945 (not long after the collapse of the Roer Triangle), Blumentritt was appointed commander of the 25th Armee in the Netherlands, and all ground combat units in the country, not only of the Army, but also of the Navy and Air Force were brought together under this army. The army was tasked with holding Holland as a "fortress" under all circumstances. Blumentritt presented his assessment to Rundstedt that the Allied forces, in the aftermath of the failed attempt to swing north through Arnhem, would bypass Holland and cross the Rhine further south (an accurate prediction), thus cutting off the forces in Holland. However, Hitler refused to evacuate the country and consequently the German forces in Holland later fell into Allied hands without a major battle. It was also during this time that Blumentritt received the Oak Leaves (Eichenlaub) to the Knights Cross of the Iron Cross. He was the 741st person to receive this award.

Later, the Germans were pushed back to the Ruhr and, after the war Blumentritt disagreed with the Allies′ strategy in the west, discussing the precarious nature of the German position with its meager one armoured division against the twelve of the Allies, and he stated that had Field Marshal Bernard Montgomery's Anglo-Canadian 21st Army Group been unleashed earlier for a concentrated armoured assault (as he had wished) rather than fighting on a broad front, "Such a breakthrough ... would have torn the weak German front to pieces and ended the war in the winter of 1944."

On 27 March 1945, Blumentritt briefly assumed command of the increasingly demoralized 1st Parachute Army and then, from 8 April commanded "Army Group Blumentritt"—an ad-hoc collection of depleted units on the Weser river from Hameln to the Baltic Sea—up to the end of the war. He was tasked to delay the Anglo-Canadian advance into northern Germany and he attempted to keep the Baltic sea ports open as long as possible so that German refugees could escape from the Russian advance in the east. On 2 May, after the death of Hitler on 30 April, Blumentritt ordered his men to give no further resistance to the allies and to fall back gradually. In early May, Blumentritt acted as a first emissary to General Montgomery for the surrender of the German forces in the North-West.

After the war
After capitulation on 5 May, Blumentritt and his command cooperated in demobilization, under orders from the British 2nd Army, and the taking of prisoners did not take place until 1 June. He was captured in Schleswig-Holstein and was placed in a British prisoner-of-war camp by 1 December, was interrogated by the International Military Tribunal for the Nuremberg Trials in 1946, and was then moved to a U.S. POW camp where he remained from 6 November 1947 until 1 January 1948. During this time as a POW, he assisted the U.S. Historical Division in Germany.

In the early 1950s, he was active in the development of the new Bundeswehr army, though this rearmament was a controversial move among the civilian population of Germany, who felt they had been victimized by World War II. He was used as a military adviser for the 1962 film The Longest Day, in which he was  portrayed by actor Curd Jürgens. He died on October 12, 1967 in Munich. He published several books:

Von Rundstedt, the soldier and the man, 1952
Deutsches Soldatentum im europäischen Rahmen ("German Soldiering in a European Context"), 1952
Strategie und Taktik : ein Beitrag zur Geschichte des Wehrwesens vom Altertum bis zur Gegenwart ("Strategy and Tactics: A Contribution to the History of Defense from Antiquity until Present"), 1960
Schlacht um Moskau. Erinnerungen über die Heeresgruppe Mitte ("Battle of Moscow. Remembrances of Army Group Center"). (In: Seymour Freiden & William Richardson (editors): The Fatal Decisions. New York, 1958.)

Awards and promotions

Awards
Iron Cross (1914)
 2nd Class (29 September 1914)
 1st Class (18 March 1916)
Cross of Honor of Schwarzburg 3rd Class with swords on 3 January 1915
Knight's Cross of the Royal House Order of Hohenzollern with swords on 7 July 1918
Wound Badge in Black in August, 1918
Clasp to the Iron Cross (1939)
 2nd Class (19 September 1939)
 1st Class (29 September 1939)
German Cross in Gold on 26 January 1942 as Oberst im Generalstab (in the General Staff) of AOK 4
Eastern Front Medal 1941/42 on 7 August 1942
Knight's Cross of the Iron Cross with Oak Leaves
Knight's Cross on 13 September 1944 as General der Infanterie and chief of the general staff of the Heeresgruppe D
741st Oak Leaves on 18 February 1945 as General der Infanterie and acting commander of the 25th Army

References

Citations

Bibliography

Blumentritt, Günther (January, 1949) Operation Sealion An Cosantoir
Blumentritt, Günther (March, 1949) "The Battle of Northwest Germany" An Cosantoir
Bradley, Dermont; Hildebrand, Karl-Friedrich; Rovekamp, Markus (1993) Die Generale des Heeres, 1921-1945, Biblio Verlag 
Cole, Hugh M. (1950) The Lorraine Campaign. United States Army Center of Military History 
Cooper, Matthew (1978) The German Army: 1933-1945, Scarborough House 
Cornelius, Ryan (1974) A Bridge Too Far, Book Club Associates 
Dupuy, Johnson, & Bongard (1992) Harper Encyclopedia of Military Biography, HarperCollins 
Evans, Richard J. (2008) The Third Reich at War, Penguin Books 
 
Fellgiebel, Walther-Peer (2003) The Elite of the Third Reich: The Recipients of the Knights Cross of the Iron Cross 1939-1945, Helion 
Freiden, Seymour & Richardson, William, editors (1956) The Fatal Decisions, Berkley Pub.
Harrison, Gordon A. (1951) Cross Channel Attack, United States Army Center of Military History 
Hart, Basil Lidell (1968) The Other Side of the Hill, C Chivers 
Hart, Basil Lidell (1971) German Generals Talk, Harper 
International Military Tribunal (June 24, 1946) G.S. & OKW Affidavit No. 610. Gen Blumentritt, Columbia Law Library 
Internet Movie Database (Retrieved May 12, 2010) 
Lewis, S.J. (1985) Forgotten Legions: German Army Infantry Policy 1918-1941, Praeger Pub. 
MacDonald, Charles B. (1963) The Siegfried Line Campaign, United States Army Center of Military History   
 
Reuters (May 5, 1945) "Germans Surrender in North-West" The Times
 
 
Shirer, William L. (1959) The Rise and Fall of the Third Reich: A History of Nazi Germany, Simon & Schuster 
Shulman, Milton (1948) Defeat in the West, E.P. Dutton 
U.S 43rd Infantry Division HQ (January 15, 1945) Report on Operation Blackcock
 
Wilmot, Chester (1952) The Struggle for Europe, Collins (re-issued by Wordsworth 1998)

External links

1892 births
1967 deaths
Musicians from Munich
German Army generals of World War II
Generals of Infantry (Wehrmacht)
People from the Kingdom of Bavaria
Recipients of the Gold German Cross
Recipients of the Knight's Cross of the Iron Cross with Oak Leaves
German Army personnel of World War I
Burials at Munich Waldfriedhof
Prussian Army personnel
Recipients of the clasp to the Iron Cross, 1st class
Reichswehr personnel
German prisoners of war in World War II held by the United States
German prisoners of war in World War II held by the United Kingdom
20th-century Freikorps personnel
Military personnel from Munich